Gürbulak is a village in Doğubayazıt District, Ağrı Province, Turkey. Its population is 2,205 (2021). It is a border crossing into Iran. The settlement marks the eastern limit of the state road D.100 and the European route E80.

References 

Iran–Turkey border crossings
Populated places in Ağrı Province